Movses Kaghankatvatsi ( Movses Kaġankatvac’i), or Movses Daskhurantsi ( Movses Dasxuranc’i) is the reputed author (or authors) of a tenth-century Classical Armenian historiographical work on Caucasian Albania and eastern provinces of Armenia, known as The History of the Country of Albania .

Authorship 
The first historian to mention Movses' work was medieval Armenian legal scholar Mkhitar Gosh, referring to him as "Movses Daskhurantsi." 
A later historian, Kirakos Gandzaketsi, author of the History of Armenia, referred to a statement in the History itself, to attribute the name of the author as Movses Kaghankatvatsi.  The statement in question (Book II, ch. 11) says:

Movses narrates the Khazar invasion of Transcaucasia and other events up to the seventh century in Book I and II of History. 
Book III of his History differs from the previous ones in style of writing and date. It deals with the Caspian expeditions of the Rus' and their conquest of Partav in the tenth century.
Because of such time lapse and difference in style, attribution of the work to a single author seems doubtful. For this reason it has been common to assume two consecutive authors or editors, 
Kaghankatvatsi (7th century) as the author of Books I and II, and Daskhurantsi (tenth century) as the editors of Kaghankatvatsi's text and the author of Book III.

Publications and translations

Grabar (Old Armenian)

Russian translation

Georgian translation

English translations

References

Kagankatvatsi